The Crooked Road is a 1911 silent short film directed by D. W. Griffith. It is preserved in a paper print in the Library of Congress collection.

Cast
Dell Henderson - The Husband
Stephanie Longfellow - The Wife
Kate Bruce - A Neighbor
William J. Butler - Pawnbroker
Edward Dillon 
John T. Dillon - In Bar/ In Second Bar (*as Jack Dillon)
Gladys Egan - One of the Children
Joseph Graybill - An Evil Companion
Guy Hedlund - In Second Bar
Grace Henderson - The Landlady
Jeanie MacPherson - In Pawnshop
Claire McDowell - A Neighbor
W. Chrystie Miller - In Second Bar
Alfred Paget - In Bar
Baden Powell - One of the Children

References

External links
The Crooked Road at IMDb.com

1911 films
American silent short films
Films directed by D. W. Griffith
American black-and-white films
1910s American films